Ivan Nikitin (Russian: Иван Никитин) may refer to:

 Ivan Nikitin (painter) ( – 1741), Russian painter of portraits and battle paintings
 Ivan Nikitin (poet) (1824-1861), Russian poet